Two human polls comprised the 1971 NCAA University Division football rankings. Unlike most sports, college football's governing body, the NCAA, does not bestow a national championship, instead that title is bestowed by one or more different polling agencies. There are two main weekly polls that begin in the preseason—the AP Poll and the Coaches Poll.

Legend

AP Poll
For the first time, the top two teams in the final poll were from the same conference; Nebraska (13–0) and Oklahoma (11–1) were joined by Colorado (10–2) in third for a sweep by the Big Eight Conference.

Final Coaches Poll
The final UPI Coaches Poll was released prior to the bowl games, in early December.
Nebraska received 29 of the 31 first place votes; Alabama received the other two.

 Prior to the 1975 season, the Big Ten and Pac-8 conferences allowed only one postseason participant each, for the Rose Bowl.

References

College football rankings